William Fitzgerald  was an Anglican bishop in Ireland at the end of the 17th-century and the beginning of the 18th.

Fitzgerald had previously been Archdeacon of Ross, Ireland then Dean of Cloyne from 1671 to 1791 when he was nominated for the See of  Clonfert and Kilmacduagh on 9 December 1690. He was consecrated on 26 July 1691 and died in 1722.

References

Deans of Cloyne
Bishops of Clonfert and Kilmacduagh
1722 deaths
Archdeacons of Ross, Ireland